HMS Discovery was a Royal Navy ship launched in 1789 and best known as the lead ship in George Vancouver's exploration of the west coast of North America in his famous 1791-1795 expedition. She was converted to a bomb vessel in 1798 and participated in the Battle of Copenhagen. Thereafter she served as a hospital ship and later as a convict ship until 1831. She was broken up in 1834.

Early years

Discovery was launched in 1789 and purchased for the Navy in 1790. She was named after the previous HMS Discovery, one of the ships on James Cook's third voyage to the Pacific Ocean. The earlier Discovery was the ship on which Vancouver had served as a midshipman.

Discovery was a full-rigged ship with a standard crew complement of 100 including a widow's man. She had been designed and built for a voyage of exploration to the Southern whale fisheries.

Discoverys first captain was Henry Roberts, with Vancouver as his first lieutenant. But when the Nootka Crisis began in 1789, Roberts and Vancouver were posted elsewhere. The ship then became a depot (hulk) for processing sailors brought in by press gangs in Chatham. Vancouver then returned and was given full command of Discovery to assist with the Nootka Sound Conventions.

Voyages of discovery

Southern hemisphere
Both ships stopped at Cape Town before exploring the south coast of Australia. In King George Sound, the Discoverys naturalist and surgeon Archibald Menzies collected various plant species including Banksia grandis. This was the first recording of the genus Banksia from Western Australia. The two ships sailed to Hawaii where Vancouver met Kamehameha I. Chatham and Discovery then sailed on to the Northwest Pacific.

Northwest America

Over the course of the next four years, Vancouver surveyed the northern Pacific Ocean coast in Discovery wintering in Spanish California or Hawaii. Vancouver named many features after friends and associates, including:
 Mount Baker, named after 3rd Lieutenant Joseph Baker, the first on the expedition to spot it
 Mount St. Helens, named after Alleyne Fitzherbert, 1st Baron St Helens
 Puget Sound, after Discovery's lieutenant Peter Puget, who explored its southern reaches.
 Mount Hood
 Mount Rainier
 Discovery Bay and Port Discovery.

Discoverys primary mission was to exert British sovereignty over this part of the Northwest Coast following the hand-over of the Spanish Fort San Miguel at Nootka Sound, although exploration in co-operation with the Spanish was seen as an important secondary objective. Exploration work was successful as relations with the Spanish went well; resupply in California was especially helpful. Vancouver and the Spanish commandant Juan Francisco de la Bodega y Quadra were on such good terms that the original name of Vancouver Island was actually Vancouver and Quadra's Island.

In 1793, Discovery entered a bay on the northern end of the Prince of Wales Island when a storm arose. Its shelter led to it being named Port Protection. Baker Point, the northwest point of Prince of Wales Island is named after the Discovery's 3rd Lieutenant Joseph Baker.

It is remarkable that during Discoverys five-year voyage she lost only six sailors, all in accidents; none died from scurvy or violence.

Diplomatic role
Discovery was meant to bring a resolution to the disposition of control over Nootka Sound. But despite four years of dispatches with their home governments, Vancouver and Quadra failed to formally conclude an agreement.

 Later years 

Discovery put into St Helena in July 1795. There on 2 July 1795 Discovery and the brig Chatham captured a Dutch East Indiaman, Makassar, which sailed in, unaware that the newly established Batavian Republic was at war with Great Britain. Some prize money was due to be paid in November 1824.

They arrived at Shannon in September and Discovery sailed on to England.

After four years at sea, Discovery was in great need of a refit. She was laid up until 1798 when she was refitted as a bomb vessel and recommissioned under Commander John Dick.

In October 1800 Commander John Conn replaced Dick. Discovery participated  in the Battle of Copenhagen in April 1801. In 1847 the Admiralty authorized the issuance of the Naval General Service medal with clasp "Copenhagen 1801" to all surviving claimants from the campaign.

On 4 August 1801, Discovery served with Nelson when he resolved to attack an enemy flotilla off Boulogne using Bomb vessels. On the night of 15 August, the British attacked in four divisions, with Conn in charge of four boats armed with howitzers. Discovery had one man wounded in the unsuccessful British attack. Discovery was then paid off in October, and laid up in ordinary in May 1802.

Later career and fate
Discovery was recommissioned in May 1803 under Commander John Joyce, with Commander Charles Pickford replacing him in August. Pickford continued in command until 1805.

In 1807 Discovery was at Sheerness, serving as a hospital ship. She continued in this role until 1815.

In 1818 Discovery was converted to a convict ship at Woolwich. In 1824 she moved to Deptford, where she continued to serve as a convict ship until at least 1831. She was broken up there in 1834.

Notable crew and passengers

Among the notable persons who served on Discoverys great voyage:
 Captain George Vancouver
 1st Lieutenant Zachary Mudge - promoted to admiral in 1849
 2nd Lieutenant Peter Puget - promoted to rear admiral in 1821
 3rd Lieutenant Joseph Baker - Post captain in 1809
 Master Joseph Whidbey  - later a naval engineer noted for the breakwater at Plymouth
 Thomas Manby - initially master's mate, promoted to lieutenant on Discovery
 William Robert Broughton - initially in command of Chatham, later a rear-admiral
 Archibald Menzies - naturalist and surgeon
 Thomas Pitt, 2nd Baron Camelford - sent back to England in disgrace.
 Robert Barrie - commissioner of the dockyard at Kingston, Upper Canada

See also
 European and American voyages of scientific exploration

Notes, citations, and referencesNotesCitationsReferences'

External links
 

Exploration ships of the United Kingdom
History of Australia (1788–1850)
Bomb vessels of the Royal Navy
Ships built in Rotherhithe
1789 ships
Age of Discovery ships